El Tejar is a district and the head city of the El Guarco canton, in the Cartago province of Costa Rica.

Geography 
El Tejar has an area of  km² and an elevation of  metres.

Locations 
 Barrios (neighborhoods): Asunción, Barahona, Barrio Nuevo, Colonia, Chavarría, Sabana, Sabana Grande, San Rafael, Santa Gertrudis, Sauces, Silo, Viento Fresco

Demographics 

For the 2011 census, El Tejar had a population of  inhabitants.

Transportation

Road transportation 
The district is covered by the following road routes:
 National Route 2
 National Route 228
 National Route 236

References 

Districts of Cartago Province
Populated places in Cartago Province